Ring-A-Ling or Ring A Ling may refer to:

"Ring A Ling" (Sneakbo song), 2013
"Ring A Ling" (Tiggy song), 1996
"Ring A Ling", a song  by Carlo, 1964
"Ring-A-Ling", a song by the Black Eyed Peas from The E.N.D., 2009
"Ring A Ling", a song by Michel Caron, 1964
"Ring-a-Ling", a song by Todrick Hall from Forbidden, 2018

See also
"Ring-a-ling-a-lario", a song by Jimmie Rodgers
"Ring-a-Ling-a-Ling (Let the Wedding Bells Ring)", a song by the Isley Brothers from Shout!, 1959